C.A.T. Squad: Python Wolf is a 1988 television film directed by William Friedkin and starring Joseph Cortese, Jack Youngblood, Steve James, and Deborah Van Valkenburgh. It is the sequel to C.A.T. Squad (1986) and aired May 23, 1988.

Plot
Bud Raines organizes the purchase of plutonium from a pair of smugglers who mention a large shipment of it moving that night. Bud has Sommers hold the money while he tests the plutonium on board a ship. During the process he is "made" as an agent and attacked by the smugglers. Burkholder, who has been listening to the wire, enters the boat and helps Bud arrest the smugglers.

The C.A.T. Squad traces the smuggling to South African extremists. Special Agent Nikki Pappas is sent to contact Paul Kiley, one of the key people involved in the smuggling, to trade supposedly classified blueprints. She gains his trust and becomes his lover over a period of weeks. Her fiancé John Sommers is called in for Air Force Reserve duty and quickly marries Nikki in a chaplain ceremony at the military airbase before he leaves. After taking aerial photographs they are targeted by a fighter plane that disables their aircraft and causes them to crash in the mountains of South Africa. The crew members parachute to safety but the radio operator is shot in the woods by extremists and the rest are imprisoned in a labor camp by Georg Bekker, the man seeking to obtain the plutoniumn.

Bud, Nikki, and Richard are told that the information about John's disappearance in South Africa cannot be disclosed because it is part of a secret program known as Python Wolf. Richard breaks into the office of Highsmith, the head of the program, and collects recently shredded documents, which Nikki scans into a computer and reassembles. They show that Lt. Colonel Vincent Trask is actually calling the shots. Trask insists that there were no survivors of the crash.

Mr. Curtin informs Paul that Nikki is an agent and Paul stabs her to death during a picnic after the final blueprint trade. Richard and Bud follow Paul to a subway train where he is murdered by one of Mr. Curtin's men. They pursue the killer through the steamy subway tunnels and Richard is shot shortly before Bud captures the killer. Bud beats the killer into confessing that he was hired by Curtin then he tapes Trask proposing destroying the labor camp along with the prisoners to cover up the failed mission.

Richard is released from the hospital and confronts Jim about Trask's plan to bomb the labor camp, tricking him into saying that Trask is leaving that night. Senators refuse to send troops and cannot cooperate with the military of South Africa so Bud and Richard take Trask's plane and fly to the camp, where they find most of the prisoners already killed. Bud finds John upstairs in a barn beaten but alive. John expresses how much he wishes to see Nikki and Bud has to tell him that Nikki is dead.

Bekker attempts to steal plutonium from a nearby reactor in South Africa but Richard, acting as a worker named Mr. Kurtz, activates a meltdown alarm in the middle of a robbery. Becker is unconvinced that there is actually a meltdown and shoots at Richard, who releases hot steam from a pipe into Becker's face, causing him to fall into a giant transformer connection and die of electrocution.

Cast
Joseph Cortese as Richard "Doc" Burkholder
Jack Youngblood as John Sommers
Steve James as Bud Raines
Deborah Van Valkenburgh as Nikki Pappas
Miguel Ferrer as Paul Kiley
Alan Scarfe as Georg Bekker
Brian Delate as Lt. Col. Vincent Trask
Vlasta Vrána as Colbert

Production
Filming took place in Montréal, Québec.

References

External links

1988 television films
1988 films
1988 action films
American action television films
American sequel films
Films directed by William Friedkin
Films scored by Ennio Morricone
Films about terrorism
Films set in South Africa
Films shot in Montreal
1980s English-language films